The British 2nd Destroyer Flotilla (also styled as Second Destroyer Flotilla) was a naval formation of the Royal Navy from 1909 to 1943 and again from 1945 to 1946.

History
The 2nd Destroyer Flotilla originated in early 1907 as a part of a Home Fleet Flotilla within the Home Fleet. In February 1909, that Home Fleet Flotilla was split into the 2nd and 4th Destroyer Flotillas. The new flotilla was then assigned to the 2nd Division of the Home Fleet from February 1909 to May 1912.  From May 1912 to July 1914 the flotilla was part of the Home Fleet's First Fleet. It was then transferred to the Grand Fleet from August 1914 to April 1916. After its stay with the Grand Fleet the flotilla was assigned to the Plymouth Command from April 1916 to November 1917 and was stationed at Devonport. It was next assigned to the Coast of Ireland Station from November 1917 to November 1918 based at Derry. After World War One the flotilla was assigned to the Atlantic Fleet from December 1918 to November 1924. In December 1924 it was sent to join the Mediterranean Fleet where it stayed until June 1932. It was recalled back to home waters as part of the Home Fleet between from June 1932 to August 1936. It was sent back to join the Mediterranean Fleet from August 1936 until September 1939. The flotilla was gradually dispersed to the South Atlantic and West Indies, and in January 1940 it was reformed once more as part of the Home Fleet until May 1940. On 1 June 1940 it was sent to join the Mediterranean Fleet until 1 August 1942. It was next transferred to the Eastern Fleet where it remained until June 1943 when it was disbanded. The flotilla was re-established in July 1944 and assigned to the Home Fleet until 1947. Its final posting was with the Mediterranean Fleet until 1951 when it was re-designated as the 2nd Destroyer Squadron.

Operational deployments

Administration
A Captain (D) afloat or Captain Destroyers afloat is an operational commander responsible for the command of a destroyer flotilla or squadron.

Captains (D) afloat 2nd Destroyer Flotilla
Incomplete list of post holders included:

References

Sources
Harley, Simon; Lovell, Tony. (2018) "Second Destroyer Flotilla (Royal Navy) - The Dreadnought Project". www.dreadnoughtproject.org. Harley and Lovell.
 Watson, Dr Graham. (2015) Royal Navy Organisation and Ship Deployments 1900-1914". www.naval-history.net. G. Smith. 
 Watson, Dr Graham. (2015) "Royal Navy Organisation and Ship Deployment, Inter-War Years 1914-1918". www.naval-history.net. Gordon Smith.
 Watson, Dr Graham. (2015) "Royal Navy Organisation in World War 2, 1939-1945". www.naval-history.net. Gordon Smith.

Destroyer flotillas of the Royal Navy
Military units and formations established in 1909
Military units and formations disestablished in 1943